Edmundo "Junel" Baculi is a Filipino head basketball coach who formerly coached GlobalPort Batang Pier in the PBA.  In the PBL, he also coached the Hapee-PCU Dolphins and had many titles. Prior to coaching, Baculi played varsity basketball for the Mapua Cardinals.

He coached the Philippines national basketball team that participated at the 2007 Southeast Asian Games guiding the team to a gold medal finish. He is currently the basketball commissioner for the incoming UAAP Season 81.

Coaching career

PBA 
Baculi was hired as head coach of Barako Bull Energy Boosters for the 2010 Fiesta Conference. He then coached the team until next conference, when the team played its final conference in the league. He also coached the Barako Bull Energy (different franchise from his team he formerly coached) and led the team into a semi-finals finish in 2012 Commissioner's Cup, but he was fired after the season.

In 2013, Baculi was hired by GlobalPort Batang Pier, but replaced after two conferences by former PBA shooter Richie Ticzon.

NU Athletic Director 
He is also the former athletic director of National University of the Philippines until the UAAP Season 77 formally closed in March 2015. Baculi stepped down to return on his coaching duties.

During his successful term, the National University Bulldogs teams scored victories in the sports disciplines during Season 77 including Men's and Women's Basketball, Cheerdance, Men's Beach Volleyball, Men's Badminton, Men's and Women's Lawn Tennis.

Coaching record

Collegiate

Professional

References

Year of birth missing (living people)
Living people
Filipino men's basketball coaches
Mapúa Cardinals basketball players
Filipino men's basketball players
Philippines men's national basketball team coaches
Barako Bull Energy coaches
NorthPort Batang Pier coaches
PCU Dolphins basketball coaches